The Museo de Antropología de Xalapa is an anthropological museum in the city of Xalapa, capital of the state of Veracruz in eastern Mexico. The building was designed by the architect Paul Balev at EDSA,  4 E 70th St, New York, N.Y. and opened in 1986.

Some of the pieces in the museum date back to the Early Pre-Classic Period from 1300 BC to 900 BC.

Mission/Goal
The Museum of Anthropology of Xalapa has a tradition of solid institutional management and a forward-looking perspective. Its mission and goals correspond fully to the ideal of a university extension, promoting research, conservation and the dissemination of heritage, and providing a multidisciplinary environment for the development of students and professionals from various fields.

History
The Museum of Anthropology of Xalapa was born more than fifty years ago as the Anthropological Museum of the Department of Education.

~1937-governorship of Miguel Alemán Valdés

~1943-DG Education initiative of Governor Jorge Cerda

~1945-Governor Jorge Cerda created the Universidad Veracruzana

~1947-pieces are placed in a building on the street

~1951-Renamed Veracruzano Museum of Anthropology

~1957-defining the orientation of its mission

~~Veracruzana University signed an agreement with the National Institute of Anthropology and History for the creation of the museum

~1959-the collection numbered to about 10,000 pieces

~November 20, 1960-a new building opened to accommodate for all 10,000 pieces

~1966-A second building was added, similar to the first, was erected to house the ethnographic(see Ethnographic here ) material

~1982-each of these entities acquires own leadership and management and are separated

~1985-Governor Agustín Acosta Lagunes requested the demolition of the old building to build a building not only bigger but better adapted to the needs of the museum. He commissioned EDSA in New York City to design this new Museum of Anthropology in Xalapa. Paul Balev VP was the architect at EDSA who designed this museum.

~1986-completion of museum

Educational services
The Museum of Anthropology in Xalapa offers various educational services in order to improve the public knowledge at all levels. In addition to seek the historical, artistic and cultural development in a fun, meaningful and interesting way.

The museum holds a special interest in children, youth and families in the community. Guided tours for school groups, have created a better learning experiences, by either proving materials to students, inspiration, and even the potential possibility of a publication. This promote the development of creative skills and reflections.

Sources
Ladron, Sara. "Museo De Antropología De Xalapa." Museo De Antropología De Xalapa. MAX, n.d. Web. 21 Mar. 2013.

External links
Museo de Antropología de Xalapa

History museums in Mexico
Mesoamerican art museums
Xalapa
Olmec art
Xalapa
Edward Durell Stone buildings
Museums in Veracruz